The Movement / Media Research and Action Project (MRAP), founded in 1986 and operating out of Boston College, provides training and technical assistance to community and grassroots organizations. In collaboration with community and grassroots organizations, they address the problems of negative interaction between community and mass media and the lack of resources community organizations and groups experience when they attempt to change negative stereotypical images of their communities portrayed in the mass media.

William Gamson, former president of the American Sociological Association and professor of sociology at Boston College, and graduate student colleagues at Boston College founded MRAP in 1986. MRAP develops networks of community non-profit, labor, and advocacy organizations with whom MRAP conducts collaborative action research on media related topics. MRAP began funded projects of direct action with community organizations in 1997 after several months of collaborative planning with the Massachusetts Law Reform Institute's Empowerment and Change Project (MLRI).

MRAP's primary focus of its work is with non-profit organizations in New England. However, MRAP also collaborates with two national organizations  offering technical assistance, training, and support for the development of public policy to community organizations and groups around the country. These organizations, the Preamble Center and Grassroots Policy Project of New York City and Washington D.C. share MRAP's vision of providing strategic development training to community organizations. MRAP's vision includes the development of a national media resource network (the Community Media and Internet Resource Network) which includes internet and organizational links to other media research centers on the country.

External links
MRAP website

Media Research and Action Project
Organizations based in Boston
Organizations established in 1986